Geomdansan may refer to:

 Geomdansan (Hanam/Gwangju), a mountain in Gyeonggi Province, South Korea, extending across the cities of Hanam and Gwangju
 Geomdansan (Seongnam/Gwangju), a mountain in Seongnam and Gwangju, Gyeonggi Province, South Korea